John Henry Gear (April 7, 1825 – July 14, 1900) served as the 11th Governor of Iowa, a United States representative and a member of the United States Senate.

Biography
Born in Ithaca, New York, he attended the common schools and moved to Galena, Illinois, in 1836, to Fort Snelling, Minnesota, in 1838, and to Burlington, Iowa, in 1843, where he engaged in mercantile pursuits. He was elected mayor of Burlington in 1863 and as a member of the Iowa House of Representatives from 1871 to 1877, serving as Speaker for two terms.

Gear was Governor of Iowa from 1878 to 1882. He was elected as a Republican to represent Iowa's 1st congressional district in the U.S. House for the Fiftieth and Fifty-first Congresses, serving from March 4, 1887, to March 3, 1891. He was an unsuccessful candidate for reelection in 1890, but was appointed by President Benjamin Harrison as Assistant Secretary of the Treasury, serving from 1892 to 1893. He returned to the U.S. House for one final term, winning the 1892 1st district election, then serving in the Fifty-third Congress, from March 4, 1893, to March 3, 1895.

In 1894, Gear was elected by the Iowa General Assembly to the United States Senate. He was reelected in 1900. He served from March 4, 1895, until his death on July 14, 1900, before the start of his second term. He had been chairman of the United States Senate Committee on Pacific Railroads in the Fifty-fourth through Fifty-Sixth Congresses.

He died, aged 75, in Washington, D.C., and his interment was in Aspen Grove Cemetery in Burlington.

See also
List of United States Congress members who died in office (1900–1949)

References

http://freepages.books.rootsweb.com/~cooverfamily/album_12.html
http://babel.hathitrust.org/cgi/pt?id=nyp.33433082380605;view=1up;seq=5 Memorial addresses on the life and character of John Henry Gear late a senator from Iowa delivered in the Senate and the House of Representatives frontispiece 1901

1825 births
1900 deaths
Republican Party governors of Iowa
Speakers of the Iowa House of Representatives
People from Galena, Illinois
Politicians from Ithaca, New York
People from Washington, D.C.
Mayors of places in Iowa
Politicians from Burlington, Iowa
United States Assistant Secretaries of the Treasury
Republican Party United States senators from Iowa
Republican Party members of the United States House of Representatives from Iowa
19th-century American politicians
People from Fort Snelling, Minnesota